Elonet is a website run by the Finnish National Audiovisual Archive which provides a database of about 150,000 films created or screened in Finland. It was launched in 2006.

References

External links
 

Finnish film websites
Online film databases
2006 establishments in Finland
Government-owned websites